Events from the year 1323 in the Kingdom of Scotland.

Incumbents
Monarch – Robert I

Events
3 January – Andrew Harclay, 1st Earl of Carlisle signs a peace treaty with Robert the Bruce.
3 March – Andrew Harclay executed for treason by Edward II of England.
30 May – Less than three months after Harclay's execution, King Edward II agrees to a thirteen-year truce with Scotland.

See also

 Timeline of Scottish history

References

 
Years of the 14th century in Scotland
Wars of Scottish Independence